Richard Bodle (23 December 1816 – 21 January 1869) was an amateur English cricketer.

Bodle made his first-class cricket debut for Sussex against Kent in 1838. This was Bodles only first-class appearance for Sussex.

Bodle made his debut for Hampshire against the Marylebone Cricket Club in 1842. Bodle played 14 first-class matches for Hampshire from 1842 to 1849, with his final appearance for the county coming against an All-England Eleven.

In his 14 matches for Hampshire, he took 15 wickets at a bowling average of 12.37, with one five wicket haul against Petworth in 1845.

Bodle also stood as an Umpire in 2 first-class matches, one in 1842 when Hampshire played an early England side and in 1866 when Hampshire played the Marylebone Cricket Club.

Bodle died at Southampton, Hampshire on 21 January 1869.

External links

1816 births
1869 deaths
People from Alfriston
English cricketers
Sussex cricketers
Hampshire cricketers
English cricket umpires